Dheere Dheere Se also known as Aashayon Ka Savera...Dheere Dheere Se is an Indian Hindi-language drama television series produced by Siddharth Kumar Tewary under their banner Swastik Productions. The series stars Reena Kapoor and Rahil Azam, premiered on 12 December 2022 on Star Bharat.

The tender story of love across borders, the enduring power of love, a story of a widow woman’s compromises after her husband’s death. Bhavana story revolves around the misfortunes and pain that will stay with her forever…beyond her control.

Premise
Tragedy follows a grieving widow, Bhavana, as she navigates through the hardships of life. In pursuit of a better future, she must brave against the odds.

Cast

Main
 Reena Kapoor  as Bhavana Deepak Shastri : Aanchal's mother, Deepak's widow.
 Rahil Azam as Raghav Srivastav: Brijmohan and Savita's son; Gaurav and Dimple's brother and Swati's brother-in law.
 Dhruti Mangeshkar as Aanchal "Bulbul" Shastri: Deepak and Bhavana's daughter

Recurring
 Vijay Badlani as Deepak Shastri: Bhavana's husband; Aanchal's father (dead)
 Raja Kapse as Jagjeevan Shastri: Father of Bhanu and Deepak Shastri
  Aman Verma as Bhanu Shastri
 Emir Shah as Abhishek Shastri: Bhanu's son
 Raju Kher as Brijmohan Srivastav: Savita's husband; Raghav, Dimple amd Gaurav's father; Swati's father-in law.
 Shama Deshpande as Savita Brijmohan Srivastav
 Diksha Tiwari as Dimple Srivastav: Raghav and Gaurav's young sister; Savita and Brijmohan's younger daughter; Swati's sister-in law.
 Tisha Kapoor as Meera Mishra: Nirmala and Manohar's daughter; Abhishek's ex–fiance.
 Jiya Solanki as Aarushi / Chulbul 
 Shilpa Kataria Singh as Nirmala Manohar Mishra: Meera's mother
 Yogesh Mahajan as Manohar Mishra: Meera's father
 Munendra Singh Kushwah as Inspector Rajesh Kaushik: Raghav's Friend 
 Bhavana Aneja as Vidya Amit Shastri 
 Praneet Bhatt as Amit Shastri : Bhanu's brother
 Malini Sengupta as Malini Bhanu Shastri: Bhanu Shastri's wife
 Nidhi Tiwari as Poonam Vikas Sharma: Shastri family's neighbour 
 Nirmala Chandra
 Abhimanyu Rai 
 Mani Rai as Vikas Sharma: A tenant and Poonam's husband
 Amit Sinha as Mr. Verma: Staff of Brijmohan Srivastav at BSA Office
 Shyam Lal Navait as Devraj: Raghav's helper 
 Suman Gupta as Swati Gaurav Srivastav: Gaurav's wife; Srivastav's young daughter-in law.
 Vikrant Kaul as Gaurav Srivastav: Brijmohan's son and Raghav and Dimple's brother
 Brijesh Maurya as Raghav's office peon

Production

Casting
Reena Kapoor as Bhawana, and Rahil Azam as Raghav were signed as the lead.

Aman Verma and Ruhi Chaturvedi was cast to portray the negative lead.

Development
The series marks comeback for Aman Verma into fiction after five years.

Filming
The shooting of the series began in November 2022, mainly shot at the Film City, Mumbai. Some initial sequences were also shot at Ujjain.

Release
The first promo arrived in November 2022 featuring Reena Kapoor as Bhawana.
It replaced Bohot Pyaar Karte Hai from 12 December 2022.

See also
List of programs broadcast by Star Bharat

References

External links
 Dheere Dheere Se on Disney+ Hotstar

2022 Indian television series debuts
Hindi-language television shows
Indian drama television series
Indian television soap operas
Star Bharat original programming